The State of South Carolina has a group of protected areas managed by the South Carolina State Park Service (often abbreviated to Park Service).  Formed in 1933 in conjunction with the formalization of the federal Civilian Conservation Corps program, the State Park Service is administered by the state's Department of Parks, Recreation & Tourism (SCPRT).  There are a total of 47 facilities that the State Park Service administers, protecting nearly 80,000 acres of sensitive, attractive, and/or historically significant lands in South Carolina.  The facilities fall under four types of classifications:

 37 State Parks
 8 State Historic Sites
 1 State Resort Park
 1 State Recreational Area

Cheraw State Park was the first park to be proposed within the system in 1934 with Myrtle Beach State Park becoming the first park to open in 1936.  Within six years, the State of South Carolina and the CCC opened 17 state parks.  Originally under the jurisdiction of the South Carolina Forestry Commission, the Park Service has been a unit within the Department of Parks, Recreation & Tourism since its formation in 1967.  Hunting Island State Park in Beaufort County is the most popular state park in South Carolina and among the most popular in the United States, attracting 1.2 million visitors per year.

References

External links
 Official website
 Official S.C. Parks Guide (2013)

State parks
 
South Carolina state parks